Agrotis cursoriodes is a moth of the family Noctuidae. It is found in Syria.

Agrotis
Moths of the Middle East
Moths described in 1903